Sanjaranda is an administrative ward in the Manyoni District of the Singida Region of Tanzania. In 2016 the Tanzania National Bureau of Statistics report there were 9,687 people in the ward, from 8,828 in 2012.

References

Wards of Singida Region